Andy Warhol: A Documentary Film is a four-hour 2006 documentary by Ric Burns about pop artist Andy Warhol.

The film is Burns' cinematic argument that Warhol was the greatest artist of the second half of the 20th century. (Picasso is credited with having that honor in the first half of the 20th century.)

Laurie Anderson narrates the movie.

In one segment, Burns compares Warhol's portraits of such celebrities as Marilyn Monroe and Elizabeth Taylor with the icons of saints that Warhol saw in his boyhood Byzantine Catholic parish, where he spent many hours as a child.

Burns follows Warhol through his meteoric rise in New York's commercial art world during the 1950s. Burns cites 1962, the year Warhol first exhibited his soup can paintings in Los Angeles, as the turning point in Warhol's career.

Burns also describes in detail Valerie Solanas' near-fatal shooting of Warhol in 1968.

Andy Warhol: A Documentary Film debuted in early September 2006 with a two-week theatrical run in New York City at Film Forum that charged no admission. The movie was televised in the United States over two nights, September 20–21, 2006, on PBS as part of its American Masters series.

External links
 PBS American Masters: Andy Warhol
 Ric Burns: Andy Warhol: A Documentary Film
 Stephen Holden's review in The New York Times

 WARHOLCITY - Andy Warhol Museum of Modern Art - Medzilaborce, Slovakia (city of origin)

2006 television films
2006 films
Andy Warhol
Cultural depictions of Valerie Solanas
Documentary films about painters
2000s American documentary television series
Films directed by Ric Burns
American Masters films
2000s American films